CEIBA Intercontinental is an airline headquartered in Malabo, Equatorial Guinea, and based at Malabo International Airport.

History
In 2009, the Agence France Press (AFP) reported that the CEO of CEIBA Intercontinental Mamadou Jaye, a Senagalese citizen of Gambian origin, left Equatorial Guinea with a suitcase containing 3.5 billion CFA francs (approximately 5 million euros or 6.5 million United States dollars) and spare ATR aircraft parts to negotiate trade deals with Côte d'Ivoire, The Gambia, Ghana, and Senegal and to establish a West African office for CEIBA. The report said that Jaye never returned to Equatorial Guinea.  Jaye denied that he took money from the company and filed a lawsuit against Rodrigo Angwe, the Malabo-based correspondent for Agence France Presse and Radio France Internationale (RFI) who submitted the story. Angwe used an employee as a source; the employee said that he received the information from the internet. After the employee's admission, AFP and RFI retracted the story. Jaye accused Angwe of publishing the internet article himself.

The airline was on the list of air carriers banned in the European Union but it currently has scheduled direct flights from Malabo to Madrid via a wetlease agreement with White Airways.

Destinations

CEIBA Intercontinental flies to the following destinations as of August 2017:

Fleet
As of August 2018, CEIBA Intercontinental operated the following aircraft:

Services
CEIBA Intercontinental aircraft have economy class and business class cabins. In addition, the airline's single Boeing 777-200LR includes a first class cabin.

Accidents and incidents
On 5 September 2015, a Boeing 737 flying Flight 071 (Dakar - Cotonou) collided with a HS-125 air ambulance flying from Ouagadougou, Burkina Faso, to Dakar, Senegal. The Boeing 737 diverted to Malabo where it landed safely. The air ambulance apparently suffered a decompression incident and is believed to have crashed in the Atlantic Ocean.

References

External links

Airlines of Equatorial Guinea
Airlines established in 2007
Airlines banned in the European Union
Malabo
2007 establishments in Africa